The neutron detection temperature, also called the neutron energy, indicates a free neutron's kinetic energy, usually given in electron volts. The term temperature is used, since hot, thermal and cold neutrons are moderated in a medium with a certain temperature. The neutron energy distribution is then adapted to the Maxwell distribution known for thermal motion. Qualitatively, the higher the temperature, the higher the kinetic energy of the free neutrons. The momentum and wavelength of the neutron are related through the de Broglie relation. The large wavelength of slow neutrons allows for the large cross section.

Neutron energy distribution ranges 

But different ranges with different names are observed in other sources.

The following is a detailed classification:

Thermal 
A thermal neutron is a free neutron with a kinetic energy of about 0.025 eV (about 4.0×10−21 J or 2.4 MJ/kg, hence a speed of 2.19 km/s), which is the energy corresponding to the most probable speed at a temperature of 290 K (17 °C or 62 °F), the mode of the Maxwell–Boltzmann distribution for this temperature, Epeak = 1/2 k T.

After a number of collisions with nuclei (scattering) in a medium (neutron moderator) at this temperature, those neutrons which are not absorbed reach about this energy level.

Thermal neutrons have a different and sometimes much larger effective neutron absorption cross-section for a given nuclide than fast neutrons, and can therefore often be absorbed more easily by an atomic nucleus, creating a heavier, often unstable isotope of the chemical element as a result. This event is called neutron activation.

Epithermal

Neutrons of energy greater than thermal
Greater than 0.025 eV

Cadmium

Neutrons which are strongly absorbed by cadmium
Less than 0.5 eV.

Epicadmium

Neutrons which are not strongly absorbed by cadmium
Greater than 0.5 eV.

Cold (Slow) neutrons

 Neutrons of lower (much lower) energy than thermal neutrons.
 Less than 5 meV.
Cold (Slow) neutrons are subclassified into cold (CN), very cold (VCN), and ultra-cold (UCN) neutrons, each having particular characteristics in terms of their optical interactions with matter. As the wavelength is made (chosen to be) longer,  lower values of the momentum exchange become accessible. Therefore, it is possible to study larger scales and slower dynamics. Gravity also plays a very significant role in the case of UCN. Nevertheless, UCN reflect at all angles of incidence. This is because their momentum is comparable to the optical potential of materials. This effect is used to store them in bottles and study their fundamental properties e.g. lifetime, neutron electrical-dipole moment etc... The main limitations of the use of slow neutrons is the low flux and the lack of efficient optical devices (in the case of CN and VCN). Efficient neutron optical components are being developed and optimized to remidy this lack.

Resonance

Refers to neutrons which are strongly susceptible to non-fission capture by U-238.
1 eV to 300 eV

Intermediate

Neutrons that are between slow and fast
Few hundred eV to 0.5 MeV.

Fast
 A fast neutron is a free neutron with a kinetic energy level close to 1 MeV (100 TJ/kg), hence a speed of 14,000 km/s or higher. They are named fast neutrons to distinguish them from lower-energy thermal neutrons, and high-energy neutrons produced in cosmic showers or accelerators.

Fast neutrons are produced by nuclear processes:
Nuclear fission produces neutrons with a mean energy of 2 MeV (200 TJ/kg, i.e. 20,000 km/s), which qualifies as "fast". However the range of neutrons from fission follows a Maxwell–Boltzmann distribution from 0 to about 14 MeV in the center of momentum frame of the disintegration, and the mode of the energy is only 0.75 MeV, meaning that fewer than half of fission neutrons qualify as "fast" even by the 1 MeV criterion.
Spontaneous fission is a mode of radioactive decay for some heavy nuclides. Examples include plutonium-240 and californium-252.
Nuclear fusion: deuterium–tritium fusion produces neutrons of 14.1 MeV (1400 TJ/kg, i.e. 52,000 km/s, 17.3% of the speed of light) that can easily fission uranium-238 and other non-fissile actinides.
Neutron emission occurs in situations in which a nucleus contains enough excess neutrons that the separation energy of one or more neutrons becomes negative (i.e. excess neutrons "drip" out of the nucleus). Unstable nuclei of this sort will often decay in less than one second.

Fast neutrons are usually undesirable in a steady-state nuclear reactor because most fissile fuel has a higher reaction rate with thermal neutrons. Fast neutrons can be rapidly changed into thermal neutrons via a process called moderation. This is done through numerous collisions with (in general) slower-moving and thus lower-temperature particles like atomic nuclei and other neutrons. These collisions will generally speed up the other particle and slow down the neutron and scatter it. Ideally, a room temperature neutron moderator is used for this process. In reactors, heavy water, light water, or graphite are typically used to moderate neutrons.

Ultrafast

Relativistic
Greater than 20 MeV

Other classifications
Pile
Neutrons of all energies present in nuclear reactors
0.001 eV to 15 MeV.
Ultracold
Neutrons with sufficiently low energy to be reflected and trapped
Upper bound of 335 neV

Fast-neutron reactor and thermal-neutron reactor compared
Most fission reactors are thermal-neutron reactors that use a neutron moderator to slow down ("thermalize") the neutrons produced by nuclear fission. Moderation substantially increases the fission cross section for fissile nuclei such as uranium-235 or plutonium-239. In addition, uranium-238 has a much lower capture cross section for thermal neutrons, allowing more neutrons to cause fission of fissile nuclei and propagate the chain reaction, rather than being captured by 238U. The combination of these effects allows light water reactors to use low-enriched uranium. Heavy water reactors and graphite-moderated reactors can even use natural uranium as these moderators have much lower neutron capture cross sections than light water.

An increase in fuel temperature also raises uranium-238's thermal neutron absorption by Doppler broadening, providing negative feedback to help control the reactor. When the coolant is a liquid that also contributes to moderation and absorption (light water or heavy water), boiling of the coolant will reduce the moderator density, which can provide positive or negative feedback (a positive or negative void coefficient), depending on whether the reactor is under- or over-moderated.

Intermediate-energy neutrons have poorer fission/capture ratios than either fast or thermal neutrons for most fuels. An exception is the uranium-233 of the thorium cycle, which has a good fission/capture ratio at all neutron energies.

Fast-neutron reactors use unmoderated fast neutrons to sustain the reaction, and require the fuel to contain a higher concentration of fissile material relative to fertile material (uranium-238). However, fast neutrons have a better fission/capture ratio for many nuclides, and each fast fission releases a larger number of neutrons, so a fast breeder reactor can potentially "breed" more fissile fuel than it consumes.

Fast reactor control cannot depend solely on Doppler broadening or on negative void coefficient from a moderator. However, thermal expansion of the fuel itself can provide quick negative feedback. Perennially expected to be the wave of the future, fast reactor development has been nearly dormant with only a handful of reactors built in the decades since the Chernobyl accident due to low prices in the uranium market, although there is now a revival with several Asian countries planning to complete larger prototype fast reactors in the next few years.

See also

References

External links
Language of the Nucleus

Temperature
Neutron